This is a survey of the postage stamps and postal history of Tripolitania, now part of Libya.

Tripolitana is a historic region of western Libya, centered on the coastal city of Tripoli. Formerly part of the Ottoman Empire, Tripolitania was captured by Italy in 1911 during the Italo-Turkish War.  Italy officially granted autonomy after the war, but gradually occupied the region.  Originally administered as part of a single colony, Tripolitania was a separate colony from 26 June 1927 to 1934, when it was merged into "Libya".  During World War II, Libya was occupied by the Allies and until 1947 Tripolitania (and the region of Cyrenaica) were administered by Great Britain. Italy formally renounced its claim upon the territory in the same year.

Italian post office in Tripoli

An Italian post office was opened in Tripoli in 1869. in 1909 stamps were issued for use in the Tripoli post office.

Italian Tripolitania

The Ottoman Empire ceded Tripolitania to Italy in 1912. From 1923 to 1934 stamps were issued for Tripolitania, which were used concurrently with those of Italian Libya.

The first stamps of Tripolitania were Italian "Propagation of the Faith" stamps overprinted TRIPOLITANIA issued on 24 October 1923 at the same time as those for Cyrenaica.

The first stamps inscribed for the colony were the semi-postal "Colonial Institute issue" in 1926, followed by several sets of airmail stamps, from 1931 to 1933. October 1934 saw the only regular Tripolitanian stamps issued, a set of six (along with six more airmail) promoting the 2nd Colonial Arts Exhibition. In 1934 Tripolitania, Cyrenaica and Fezzan were united as the Italian colony of Libya.

All stamps of colonial Tripolitania were printed at the Italian Government Printing Works.

Genuinely used stamps of Tripolitania (fake cancels are common) are valued at about twice as much as unused stamps.

British stamps

British stamps overprinted M.E.F. (Middle East Forces) were used from 1943 to 1948 after the area was captured by the British during World War II. From 1 July 1948 stamps overprinted B.M.A. TRIPOLATANIA were used. From 6 February 1950 to December 1951 the stamps were overprinted B.A. TRIPOLITANIA.

Kingdom of Libya
On 24 December 1951, Cyrenaica, Tripolitania and Fezzan were unified as the Kingdom of Libya under Amir Mohammed Idris Al-Senussi. After unification, stamps of Libya were used.

Tripoli International Fair issues
From 1927 to 1938, special sets inscribed "Fiera Campionaria Tripoli" were issued at the Tripoli International Fair.

See also
Postage stamps of Italian Libya
Postage stamps and postal history of Libya
Postage stamps and postal history of Cyrenaica

References & sources
References

Sources
 Encyclopaedia of Postal Authorities

External links
Postage Stamps of the Italian Colonies.

Further reading
 Ministero delle colonie, Mostra coloniale di Genova. I servizi postali ed elettrici della Tripolitania. Rome: Tipografia nazionale, di G. Bertero e C., 1914 97p.
 Sirotti, Luigi and Nuccio Taroni. Le Occupazioni Britanniche Delle Colonie Italiane 1941-1950: storia postale = Postal History of the British Occupation of Italian Colonies 1941-1950. Rome: Sassone S.R.L., 2006 363p. 
 Tchilinghirian, S.D. & Rag. R. Bernardelli. Stamps of Italy used abroad: Parts 1 and 2. London: Harris Publications Ltd., 1963–64.

Italian Libya
History of Tripolitania
Philately of Italy
Philately of Libya